Mateus Brunetti Valor (born 18 November 1999), known as Mateus Brunetti,  is a Brazilian footballer who plays for DAC Dunajská Streda as a left-back.

Club career
Brunetti made his professional Fortuna Liga debut for DAC Dunajská Streda in match against Zemplín Michalovce on 25 July 2021.

References

External links
 FC DAC 1904 Dunajská Streda official club profile 
 Futbalnet profile 
 
 

1999 births
Living people
Footballers from São Paulo
Brazilian footballers
Brazilian expatriate footballers
Association football defenders
Figueirense FC players
FC DAC 1904 Dunajská Streda players
FC ŠTK 1914 Šamorín players
Slovak Super Liga players
2. Liga (Slovakia) players
Expatriate footballers in Slovakia
Brazilian expatriate sportspeople in Slovakia